The 2010 FIM Bydgoszcz Speedway Grand Prix of Poland was the eleventh and final race of the 2010 Speedway Grand Prix season. It took place on October 9 at the Polonia Stadium in Bydgoszcz, Poland.

The Bydgoszcz Grand Prix was won by Polonia' rider Andreas Jonsson who beat Chris Harris, wild card Janusz Kołodziej and Rune Holta in the Final.

There was a second time, when two Grand Prix event in Poland was named of Poland after 1999' Wrocław and Bydgoszcz meetings.

Riders 
The Speedway Grand Prix Commission nominated Janusz Kołodziej as Wild Card, and Przemysław Pawlicki and Artur Mroczka both as Track Reserves. Injured Emil Sayfutdinov will be replaced by first Qualified Substitutes rider Piotr Protasiewicz. The Draw was made on September 24 at 13:00 CEST by Deputy President of Bydgoszcz Maciej Grześkowiak.
 (3)  Emil Sayfutdinov → (19)  Piotr Protasiewicz

Heat details

Heat after heat 
 (64.57) Bjerre, Holta, Kołodziej, Jonsson
 (64.62) Gollob, Lindgren, Andersen, Harris
 (64.44) Zetterstroem, Hampel, Crump, Protasiewicz
 (64.60) Hancock, Pedersen, Holder, Woffinden
 (65.96) Protasiewicz, Hancock, Holta, Gollob (d)
 (66.38) Harris, Kołodziej, Holder, Hampel
 (65.98) Jonsson, Lindgren, Crump, Woffinden
 (65.60) Pedersen, Zetterstroem, Andersen, Bjerre
 (65.41) Pedersen, Holta, Harris, Crump
 (64.58) Kołodziej, Zetterstroem, Woffinden, Gollob (d)
 (65.01) Protasiewicz, Andersen, Jonsson, Holder
 (65.07) Lindgren, Hancock, Hampel, Bjerre
 (64.62) Holta, Holder, Lindgren, Zetterstroem
 (64.55) Hancock, Kołodziej, Crump, Andersen
 (64.29) Jonsson, Pedersen, Hampel, Pawlicki
 (64.87) Woffinden, Protasiewicz, Bjerre, Harris
 (65.09) Andersen, Hampel, Holta, Woffinden
 (64.26) Lindgren, Pedersen, Kołodziej, Protasiewicz
 (64.25) Harris, Jonsson, Hancock, Zetterstroem
 (64.28) Crump, Holder, Mroczka, Bjerre (d)
 Semi-Finals:
 (64.54) Kołodziej, Jonsson, Pedersen, Protasiewicz
 (64.16) Holta, Harris, Hancock, Lindgren
 The Final:
 (63.84) Jonsson, Harris, Kołodziej, Holta

The intermediate classification

See also 
 Motorcycle speedway

References 

Poland 2
Speedway Grand Prix of Poland
2010